Lieutenant General Sir Thomas Patrick John Boyd-Carpenter,  (born 16 June 1938) is a former British Army officer who became Deputy Chief of the Defence Staff (Programmes and Personnel).

Early life
Boyd-Carpenter is the son of John Archibald Boyd-Carpenter, Baron Boyd-Carpenter and Margaret Mary, daughter of Lieutenant Colonel George Leslie Hall, of the Royal Engineers.

Military career
In 1957, Boyd-Carpenter was commissioned into the Scots Guards. He was invested as a Member of the Order of the British Empire in 1973. He became commanding officer of 1st Battalion Scots Guards in 1979, Commander of 24th Infantry Brigade in 1983 and director, Defence Policy at the Ministry of Defence in 1985.He went on to Chief of Staff at Headquarters British Army of the Rhine in 1988, Assistant Chief of the Defence Staff (Programmes) in 1989 and Deputy Chief of the Defence Staff (Programmes and Personnel) in 1992 before retiring in 1996.

Retirement
In retirement, he became chairman of the Kensington & Chelsea and Westminster Heath Authority and then chairman of the Moorfields Eye Hospital NHS Foundation Trust. He also became President of the Berkshire Royal British Legion.

Coat of arms
Boyd-Carpenter's inherited Arms are blazoned "Paly of six, argent and gules, on a chevron azure, 3 cross crosslets or."  Crest, on a wreath a globe in a frame all or. Supporters, two horses, party-perfess, embattled argent and gules. Motto: "Per Acuta Belli" (Through the Asperities of War).

References

1938 births
Thomas
British Army lieutenant generals
Knights Commander of the Order of the British Empire
Living people
People educated at Stowe School
Scots Guards officers
Sons of life peers